Golden Township is a township in Walsh County, North Dakota, United States. 56.4% (57) of the population are male, and the other 43.6% (44) are female.

References

See also
Walsh County, North Dakota

Townships in North Dakota
Townships in Walsh County, North Dakota